Spectator or The Spectator may refer to:
Spectator sport, a sport that is characterized by the presence of spectators, or watchers, at its matches
Audience

Publications

Canada
 The Hamilton Spectator, a Hamilton, Ontario, Canada, newspaper published since 1846

Colombia
 El Espectador, a daily newspaper

India
 The Spectator (Indian newspaper), an Indian newspaper

United Kingdom
 The Spectator, a British weekly current affairs magazine
 The Spectator (1711), a British publication between 1711 and 1712

United States
 The American Spectator, a conservative political magazine
 American Spectator (literary magazine), a literary magazine published from 1932 to 1937
 New-York Spectator, a New York City newspaper published as The Spectator from 1797 to 1804, New-York Spectator from 1804 to 1867, and New York Spectator and Weekly Commercial Advertiser from 1867 to 1876.
 Spectator Magazine, a BDSM/sex newspaper in San Francisco, California, published from 1978 until 2005
 The Washington Spectator, a liberal magazine, begun in 1971. A newspaper called the Spectator was published in Washington before the Civil War.
Student publications
 Columbia Daily Spectator, the student newspaper of Columbia University
 The Spectator (Stuyvesant High School), the student newspaper of Stuyvesant High School
 The Spectator, the student newspaper of Hamilton College
 The Spectator, the student newspaper of Valdosta State University

Film and TV
 The Spectator (film), a 2004 Italian film starring Barbora Bobulova

Other uses
 Spectators (album), an album of the German synthpop duo Wolfsheim
 Spectators, an album by Amelia Curran (musician)
 Spectatoring
 Spectator shoe, a shoe style constructed from two contrasting colors

See also